Sir Martin Teall Flett, KCB (30 July 1911 – 25 February 1982) was an English civil servant. Educated at St John's College, Oxford, he entered the civil service in 1933 as an official in the Dominions Office; he moved to HM Treasury in 1934, where he remained (except for the period 1944 to 1946) until 1956, when he moved to the Ministry of Power. In 1961, he was transferred to the Air Ministry and served as its Permanent Secretary from 1963 to 1964, when it was merged into the Ministry of Defence; there, he was Second Permanent Secretary with responsibility for the Royal Air Force from 1964 to 1968, and then Second Permanent Secretary for Equipment until 1971. He was the son of the geologist Sir John Flett.

References 

1911 births
1982 deaths
English civil servants
Alumni of St John's College, Oxford
Knights Companion of the Order of the Bath